Raj Mamodia (born July 18, 1971) is an Indian American business executive. Mamodia was CEO of Collabera in 2013, and then of Brillio, a technology company spun off from Collabera in 2014.

Early life 
Raj Mamodia studied mechanical engineering from Motilal Nehru National Institute of Technology Allahabad and did an MBA from Northwestern University Kellogg School of Management.

Career 
Mamodia worked for Cognizant before he was named CEO of information technology firm Collabera in 2013.
The company had two main components: an IT staffing branch, and a newer IT and consulting group. It was Mamodia's idea in 2014 to spin off the consulting branch as Brillio, and he became the new company’s CEO.

In 2017, Mamodia received an American business award,
and a mid-market social impact award.

References

1971 births
American technology chief executives
American chief executives
Living people
Kellogg School of Management alumni